Q.T.V. is a dormant national fraternity that was founded in  at Massachusetts Agricultural College, incorporating in .

History 
It is one of very few Latin-named fraternities, and the only one to flirt with national aims. References indicate that fraternal inquiries from emerging groups at "state schools" were met with skepticism by the established national fraternities, even those close by. This may have been the impetus for formation of the new organization, it coming just two years after the foundation of the school. The "Latin moment" fizzled; most of these soon would opt to become chapters of other Greek-named national fraternities before launching themselves beyond local status.

Q.T.V. was able to expand nationally over the next two decades, but lost chapters seeking firmer footing as "Greek Named" organizations.

Q.T.V. eventually disbanded as a national fraternity in the 20th century, with its four of its six chapters becoming associated with other Greek life organizations. After  only the mother chapter remained, which operated as a local fraternity at UMass until , surpassing the century mark in age. Its last mention in the Index yearbook were in Senior bios in the late s at a time when all groups experienced a precipitous decline and while the yearbooks de-emphasized Greek coverage.

Symbolism and traditions 
The colors of the Fraternity were White and Brown.

The flower of the Fraternity was the White Carnation.

The surviving UMass chapter published The QTV Alumni Bulletin for many years.

Chapters 
These were the chapters of Q.T.V., and where known, their outcomes.

Notes

References

External links
Information on the fraternity at UMass

Defunct fraternities and sororities
University of Massachusetts Amherst
1869 establishments in Massachusetts
Student organizations established in 1869